Andrei Anatolyevich Pridyuk (born 25 February 1994) is a Russian professional football player. He plays for FC Amkar Perm.

Club career
He made his debut in the Russian Premier League on 23 November 2013 for FC Amkar Perm in a game against FC Kuban Krasnodar.

External links
 Profile by the Russian Premier League

References

1994 births
People from Krasnokamsk
Sportspeople from Perm Krai
Living people
Russian footballers
Russia youth international footballers
Russia under-21 international footballers
Association football defenders
FC Amkar Perm players
FC Tambov players
FC Zvezda Perm players
FC Chayka Peschanokopskoye players
Russian Premier League players
Russian Second League players